Umbonata is a genus of Tanzanian orb-weaver spiders containing the single species, Umbonata spinosissima. It was first described by M. Grasshoff in 1971 to contain the single species moved from Mangora.

References

Araneidae
Monotypic Araneomorphae genera
Spiders of Africa